Christ Church South is a constituency in the Christ Church area of Barbados represented in the House of Assembly of the Barbadian Parliament since 2008 by Ralph A. Thorne MP of the BLP.

Since its founding in 1991 it has mostly been held by the BLP.

Boundaries 
From a point on the sea coast south of the terminus of the School Hill-St. Christopher Road in a straight line to the terminus of the School Hill-St. Christopher Road; thence in a northerly direction along the middle of the School Hill-St. Christopher Road to its junction with the Sayes Court-Hopewell Road; thence in a westerly direction along the middle of the Sayes Court-Hopewell Road to its junction at the roundabout with Highway U (the Hopewell-Chancery Lane Road); thence in a westerly direction along the middle of Highway U to its junction with Waverley Road; thence in a northerly direction along the middle of Waverley Road to its junction with Pegwell Boggs Road ; thence in an easterly direction along the middle of Pegwell Boggs Road to its junction with Pegwell Boggs New Road; thence in a northerly direction along the middle of Pegwell Boggs New Road to its junction with Gibbons Road; thence in a westerly direction along the middle of Gibbons Road to its junction with Highway 7 (the Oistins-Airport Road); thence in a south westerly direction along the middle of Highway 7 to its junction with Church Hill Road; thence in a westerly direction along the middle of Church Hill Road to its junction at the top of Oistins Hill with Cane Vale Road-Maxwell Hill; thence in a westerly direction along the middle of Cane Vale-Maxwell Hill to its junction with the Maxwell Hill-Graeme Hall Terrace Road; thence in a north westerly direction along the middle of the Maxwell Hill-Graeme Hall Terrace Road to its junction with the Errol Barrow Highway opposite the Ministry of Agriculture Building; thence in a northerly and then westerly direction along the middle of the Errol Barrow Highway to the eastern boundary of the Rendezvous Ridge development; thence in a southerly direction along that boundary to the base of the Rendezvous Ridge; thence in a westerly direction along the base of the Rendezvous Ridge to its junction with the Rendezvous Hill Road; thence in a southerly direction along the middle of the Rendezvous Hill Road to its junction with Highway 7; thence in a straight line to a point on the southern sea coast south of the junction of the Rendezvous Hill Road with Highway 7; thence in an easterly direction along the sea coast to a point on the coast south of the terminus of the School Hill-St. Christopher Road (the starting point).

History

Members of Parliament

Notes

References 

Constituencies of the Parliament of Barbados
Christ Church, Barbados
1991 establishments in Barbados
Constituencies established in 1991